The 1985 MOVE bombing was the destruction of residential homes in the Cobbs Creek neighborhood of Philadelphia, Pennsylvania, United States, by the Philadelphia Police Department during a standoff and shootout with the anarcho-primitivist commune MOVE. Police dropped two explosive devices from a police helicopter onto the roof of a house occupied by MOVE. The Philadelphia Fire Department allowed the resulting fire to burn out of control, destroying 61 previously evacuated neighboring homes over two city blocks and leaving 250 people homeless. Six adults and five children were killed in the attack, with one adult and one child surviving. A lawsuit in federal court found that the city used excessive force and violated constitutional rights against unreasonable search and seizure.

Background
In 1981, MOVE relocated to a row house at 6221 Osage Avenue in the Cobbs Creek area of West Philadelphia. Neighbors complained to the city for years about trash around their building, confrontations with neighbors, and bullhorn announcements of political messages by MOVE members. The bullhorn was broken and inoperable for the three weeks prior to the police bombing of the row house.

The police obtained arrest warrants in 1985 charging four MOVE occupants with crimes including parole violations, contempt of court, illegal possession of firearms, and making terroristic threats. Mayor Wilson Goode and police commissioner Gregore J. Sambor classified MOVE as a terrorist organization. Police evacuated residents of the area from the neighborhood prior to their action. Residents were told that they would be able to return to their homes after a 24-hour period.

Incident
On Monday, May 13, 1985, nearly 500 police officers, along with city manager Leo Brooks, arrived in force and attempted to clear the building and execute the arrest warrants. Water and electricity were shut off in order to force MOVE members out of the house. At 5:35 a.m., commissioner Sambor read a long speech addressed to MOVE members that started with, "Attention MOVE: This is America. You have to abide by the laws of the United States." They were given 15 minutes to come out. When the MOVE members did not respond, the police decided to forcibly remove the people who remained in house by dropping a bomb on a building,  which consisted of seven adults and six children.

There was an armed standoff with police, who threw tear gas canisters at the building. The MOVE members fired at them, and a gunfight with semi-automatic and automatic firearms ensued for 90 minutes. One officer was hit in the back in his flak jacket but was not seriously hurt. Police used more than 10,000 rounds of ammunition. At 2 p.m., commissioner Sambor ordered that the compound be bombed.

From a Pennsylvania State Police helicopter, Philadelphia Police Department Lt. Frank Powell proceeded to drop two 1.5-pound (0.75 kg) bombs (which the police referred to as "entry devices") made of  Tovex, a dynamite substitute, combined with two pounds of FBI-supplied C-4, targeting a fortified, bunker-like cubicle on the roof of the house. The bombs exploded after 45 seconds, igniting the fuel of a gasoline-powered generator and setting the house on fire, which was left to burn. Officials later stated that this was to let the fire burn through the roof and destroy the "bunker", so police could then drop tear gas into the house and flush out the occupants. 30 minutes later, firefighters moved in to control the fire but there was gunfire and the firefighters and police were ordered back as the fire spread to neighbouring houses down the street. The only two MOVE survivors, Birdie Africa, who was 13 at the time, and Ramona Africa, both escaped the house. Police initially said that two men had also run out of the house at the same time and fired at them and that police had returned fire. Ramona Africa said that police fired at those trying to escape. Police said that MOVE members moved in and out of the house shooting at the police. The fire department later declared the fire under control at 11:47 p.m.

The fire killed 11 of the people in the house, six adults and five children: John Africa, Rhonda Africa, Theresa Africa, Frank Africa, Conrad Africa, Tree Africa, Delisha Africa, Netta Africa, Little Phil Africa, Tomaso Africa, and Raymond Africa. 61 neighboring homes were destroyed by the fire, leaving 250 people unhoused.

Aftermath 
Mayor Goode appointed an investigative commission called the Philadelphia Special Investigation Commission (PSIC, aka MOVE Commission), chaired by William H. Brown, III. Commissioner Sambor resigned in November 1985; in a speech the following year, he said that he was made a "surrogate" by Goode.

In 1986, Philadelphia artists Ellen Powell Tiberino and her artist-husband Joseph created a seven-foot relief sculpture depicting their interpretation of the bombing. Titled “The MOVE Confrontation,” it depicted people engulfed in flames, Mayor W. Wilson Goode, a Death mask and horrified spectators. It created controversy in the city and produced headlines across the country. In 1985, Philadelphia was given the nickname "The City that Bombed Itself".

The MOVE Commission issued its report on March 6, 1986. The report denounced the actions of the city government, stating that dropping a bomb on an occupied row house was unconscionable. Following the release of the report, Goode made a formal public apology. No one from the city government was criminally charged in the attack. The only surviving adult MOVE member, Ramona Africa, refused to testify in court and was charged and convicted on charges of riot and conspiracy; she served seven years in prison.

Three lawsuits were filed against the city of Philadelphia including Louise James, administrator of the estate of Frank James in 1994; Ramona Africa in 1996; and Alfonso Leaphart, administrator of the estate of Vincent Leaphart.

A lawsuit appealing a judgment against the police and public officials was filed with the United States Court of Appeals for the Third Circuit on November 3, 1994 Africa v. City of Philadelphia (In re City of Philadelphia Litig.), 49 F.3d 945 (1995) and was decided on  March 6, 1995. The court decided that the plaintiffs did not have a Fourth Amendment claim against the city because there was no seizure when the defendants dropped explosives in the plaintiffs buildings, city officials and police officers had qualified immunity under 42 U.S.C.S. § 1983, but the city did not have qualified immunity from liability despite its officials being exempt.

In 1996, a federal jury ordered the city to pay a $1.5 million civil suit judgment to survivor Ramona Africa and relatives of two people killed in the bombing. The jury had found that the city used excessive force and violated the members' constitutional protections against unreasonable search and seizure. Ramona was awarded $500,000 for the pain, suffering and physical harm suffered in the fire.

In 2005, federal judge Clarence Charles Newcomer presided over a civil trial brought by residents seeking damages for having been displaced by the widespread destruction following the 1985 police bombing of MOVE. A jury awarded them a $12.83 million verdict against the City of Philadelphia.

In November 2020, the Philadelphia City Council approved a resolution to formally apologize for the MOVE bombing. The measure also established an annual day of "observation, reflection and recommitment" on May 13, the anniversary of the bombing.

Use of human remains from the bombings 
Since the bombing, the bones of two children, 14-year-old Tree (Katricia Dotson) and 12-year-old Delisha Orr, were kept at the University of Pennsylvania Museum of Archaeology and Anthropology. In 2021, Billy Penn revealed that according to the museum, the remains had been transferred to researchers at Princeton University, though the university was unaware of their exact whereabouts. The remains had been used by Janet Monge, an adjunct professor in anthropology at the University of Pennsylvania and a visiting professor in the same subject at Princeton University, in videos for an online forensics course named “Real Bones: Adventures in Forensic Anthropology,” as case studies. Present-day MOVE members were shocked to learn this, with Mike Africa Jr. stating "They were bombed, and burned alive ... and now you wanna keep their bones."

The city stated the remains had gone unclaimed by the families after the bombing, but in May 2021, the city of Philadelphia's Health Commissioner, Thomas Farley, resigned under pressure after it was revealed that in 2017 he ordered the cremation and disposal of victims' remains without either identifying them or contacting members of the family. A day after Farley's resignation, staff at the Medical Examiner's Office found the box labeled "MOVE" in a refrigerated area of their office containing the un-cremated remains. As of 2021, Mike Africa Jr. stated that the Africa family have not yet decided what to do with the remains. The sisters' remains from the Medical Examiner's Office were released to their surviving brother in August 2022.

Although the bones used by Monge in the "Real Bones" course were given to the Africa family in 2021, accounts differ regarding how many remains were at the University of Pennsylvania Museum of Archaeology and Anthropology and whether all bones from MOVE bombing victims at the museum were returned in 2021. A legal team hired by the University of Pennsylvania stated that the bones of Delisha Orr were never at the Penn Museum. However, an investigation by the City of Philadelphia disagreed, and stated that there was evidence that remains of Delisha Orr were at the Penn Museum. Nine forensic anthropologists certified by the American Board of Forensic Anthropology disagreed with the claims published by Penn's legal team and agreed with those of the City of Philadelphia. The City of Philadelphia also questioned whether all the remains of Katricia Dotson which were at the Penn Museum were given to MOVE in 2021.

See also
 Lists of killings by law enforcement officers in the United States
 Miracle Valley shootout
 Rainbow Farm
 Ruby Ridge
 Waco siege

External sites
 The Africas VS. America, a Canadian Broadcasting Corporation podcast telling the history of the incident.

References

1985 in Pennsylvania
Airstrikes conducted by the United States
Armed standoffs in the United States
Building bombings in the United States
Explosions in 1985
Fires in Pennsylvania
Improvised explosive device bombings in the United States
Law enforcement operations in the United States
Mass murder in 1985
May 1985 events in the United States
Philadelphia Police Department
Police brutality in the United States
Political repression in the United States
Riots and civil disorder in Philadelphia